Nunnahitsunega, or "Whitepath", was a full-blood traditionalist leader and member of the Cherokee National Council who lived at Turnip Town (Ulunyi), near the large Ellijay (Elatseyi) in the early 19th century.  In 1824, influenced by the teachings of the Seneca prophet Handsome Lake, he began a rebellion against the acculturation then taking place in the Cherokee Nation, proposing the rejection of Christianity and the new constitution, and a return to the old tribal laws.  He soon had a large following, whom his detractors referred to as "Red Sticks", and they formed their own council, electing Big Tiger as their principal chief.

The more progressive leaders on the national council—such as Pathkiller, Charles R. Hicks, Major Ridge, and John Ross—deposed him from his seat in 1826, but when he submitted to their authority in 1828, he was returned to his seat.

He died sometime in 1838 in the vicinity of Hopkinsville, Kentucky during the Cherokee removal.

Sources
Brown, John P.  Old Frontiers: The Story of the Cherokee Indians from Earliest Times to the Date of Their Removal to the West, 1838.  (Kingsport: Southern Publishers, 1938).
McLoughlin, William G. Cherokee Renascence in the New Republic. (Princeton: Princeton University Press, 1992).
Mooney, James. Myths of the Cherokee and Sacred Formulas of the Cherokee. (Nashville: Charles and Randy Elder-Booksellers, 1982).

References

Cherokee Nation politicians (1794–1907)
1838 deaths
Year of birth missing